Milburn is a civil parish in the Eden District, Cumbria, England. It contains 15 listed buildings that are recorded in the National Heritage List for England. Of these, one is listed at Grade I, the highest of the three grades, and the others are at Grade II, the lowest grade.  The parish contains the village of Milburn and the surrounding countryside.  The largest building in the parish is Howgill House, originally a fortified house, and later a country house; this and structures associated with it are listed.  Apart from a church, all the other listed buildings are located in the village and are centred round The Green.

Key

Buildings

References

Sources

Lists of listed buildings in Cumbria